The Running Badge (German: Laufabzeichen) is an award of the German Athletics Organization. Various levels of the Running Badge are awarded for the completion of running for certain periods.
The Running Badge can be awarded either as a cloth patch or as a pin.

Levels
Laufabzeichen
 15-minute run: Silver L on green background
 30-minute run: Silver L on red background
 60-minute run: Golden L on blue background
 90-minute run: Silver L on purple background
 120-minute run: Blue L on silver background
 Marathon (42.19 km): Blue ML on golden background

Walkingabzeichen (Power walking patch)
 30-minute power walking: Blue W on golden background
 60-minute power walking: Golden W on blue background
 120-minute power walking: Blue W on grey background

Judges
 German Sports Badge judges
 Coaches
 Physical education teachers

References
  (in German)
 
German sports trophies and awards